The Prairie River (Big Sandy Lake) is a river of Minnesota.  The river is located in northern Minnesota, in northeast Aitkin County and southwest Saint Louis County.

Prairie River is the English translation of the native Ojibwe language name.

See also
List of rivers of Minnesota

References

Minnesota Watersheds
USGS Geographic Names Information Service
USGS Hydrologic Unit Map - State of Minnesota (1974)

Rivers of Minnesota
Rivers of Aitkin County, Minnesota
Rivers of St. Louis County, Minnesota